Arlind Rustemi (born 7 February 1986 in Vlorë) is an Albanian footballer who plays as a forward.

Club career
As of the 2010–11 season he played for KF Vlora in the Albanian First Division. In October 2011 he moved to Maltese side Rabat Ajax, and scored on his debut. Later he played for Himara.

He previously played for KS Gramozi Ersekë and KS Flamurtari Vlorë in the Albanian Superliga.

References

External links
 Profile - FSHF
Rabat Ajax 2011–12 player stats

1986 births
Living people
Footballers from Vlorë
Albanian footballers
Albania youth international footballers
Association football forwards
Flamurtari Vlorë players
KS Gramozi Ersekë players
KF Vlora players
Rabat Ajax F.C. players
KF Himara players
Kategoria Superiore players
Kategoria e Parë players
Albanian expatriate footballers
Expatriate footballers in Malta
Albanian expatriate sportspeople in Malta